Kazuhiko Aoki may refer to:

 Kazuhiko Aoki (politician) (born 1961), Japanese politician
 Kazuhiko Aoki (video game designer) (born 1961), Japanese video game designer